The Northwestern Eagles football program is a college football team that represents University of Northwestern – St. Paul in the Upper Midwest Athletic Conference, a part of the NCAA Division III.  The team has had 6 head coaches since its first recorded football game in 1973. The current coach is Matt Moore, who first took the position for the 2017 season.

Key

Coaches
Statistics correct as of the end of the 2022 college football season. 

table reference

Notes

References
 
 

Lists of college football head coaches

Northwestern Eagles